The Port of Chornomorsk, or Sea Port of Chornomorsk, is a port in the city of Chornomorsk, Ukraine. It is located on the north-western shore of Black Sea at Sukhyi Estuary, to the south-west from Odesa.

The Port of Chornomorsk is a universal seaport. Across the estuary in the village of Burlacha Balka is located the Illichivsk Fishing Seaport and the Illichivsk ferry, while further inland is located the ship maintenance factory.

The city Chornomorsk, where the port is located, used to be named Illichivsk; due to decommunization laws, Chornomorsk gained its current name in February 2016.

See also
 UkrFerry

References

External links

 Official website
 Ukrmorrichflot State Administration website

Buildings and structures in Odesa Oblast
Ports of Odesa Oblast
Ukrainian Sea Ports Authority